Marshall Point Light Station is a lighthouse at the entrance of Port Clyde Harbor in Port Clyde, Maine. The light station was established in 1832.

History
Marshall Point Light Station was established in 1832 to assist boats entering and leaving Port Clyde Harbor. Four acres of land previously owned by Samuel Marshall were purchased for $120. The land was named for an early settler who had a homestead, John Marshall. The original lighthouse was a  tower lit by seven lard oil lamps with 14-inch reflectors.

The original tower was replaced with the present lighthouse in 1857. The lighthouse is a  white brick tower on a granite foundation. The tower was originally lit with a fifth-order Fresnel lens. A raised wooden walkway connects the tower to land.

In 1895, the original keeper's house was destroyed by lightning. A Colonial Revival style house was built to replace it. An oil house and a bell tower with a  bell were added in 1898. All the following keepers lived in the new house, including Charles Clement who was the keeper from 1874 to 1919. The bell was replaced with a fog horn in 1969.

The lighthouse was automated in 1980 and the original Fresnel lens was replaced with a modern  optic.
The original lens is at the Maine Lighthouse Museum in Rockland. In 1986, the St. George Historical Society restored the keeper's house and established the Marshall Point Lighthouse Museum there, presenting the histories of Marshall Point Light and other nearby lighthouses. The light station was added to the National Register of Historic Places in 1988.

The lighthouse appeared in the 1994 film Forrest Gump.

The light station was transferred to the town of St. George in 1998 under the Maine Lights Program. The fog signal has been dismantled but the bell remains on display.

See also
National Register of Historic Places listings in Knox County, Maine
List of maritime museums in the United States

References

External links
 Marshall Point Lighthouse Website

Lighthouses completed in 1832
Lighthouses completed in 1857
Houses completed in 1895
Lighthouses on the National Register of Historic Places in Maine
Lighthouses in Knox County, Maine
Penobscot Bay
National Register of Historic Places in Knox County, Maine
1832 establishments in Maine